Bartholomew Owogbalor Ogbeche (born 1 October 1984) is a Nigerian professional footballer who plays as a striker for Indian Super League club Hyderabad. He is the all-time top scorer in Indian Super League history.

He played his club football in France, United Arab Emirates, Spain, Greece, England, the Netherlands and India, notably becoming the top scorer of NorthEast United, Kerala Blasters and Hyderabad in the Indian Super League. 

Ogbeche represented Nigeria at the 2002 World Cup.

Club career
Ogbeche was born in Ogoja. Still a youngster, he was signed by French Ligue 1 club Paris Saint-Germain, making his debut with the main squad during the 2001–02 season. However, he failed to settle, also suffering a thigh injury and serving two six-month loans to fellow league sides Bastia and Metz; for the former, he scored in a 4–1 home win against Olympique de Marseille on 7 March 2004– the Corsicans secured their top-flight status, and he left PSG for good in June 2005.

After a brief time in the United Arab Emirates, Ogbeche moved to Spain, first with Alavés in Segunda División. Although he posted good individual numbers, the Basque team failed to return to La Liga but he joined another club in the former tier, Real Valladolid, making his debut on 26 August 2007 in a 1–0 away victory over Espanyol (12 minutes played).

In late August 2009, after two seasons of intermittent use, Ogbeche arranged a one-year deal with Andalusia's Cádiz of the second division. He finished the campaign as team top scorer, but they finished in 19th position and were relegated.

After one year in Greece with Kavala, Ogbeche joined Football League Championship side Middlesbrough on 18 October 2011, signing until the end of the season. He scored his first goal for his new club on 17 December, against Cardiff City in a 3–2 away win. On 5 March 2012, he came on as a substitute towards the end of the home game against Barnsley, lobbing the ball over Luke Steele for the final 2–0.

Ogbeche moved clubs and countries again in January 2014, signing for Cambuur in the Netherlands after a very brief spell back in Spain with Xerez. He scored once and provided an assist in his Eredivisie debut, helping to a 3–1 home defeat of Heerenveen.

On 25 August 2018, Ogbeche joined NorthEast United. He made his Indian Super League debut on 1 October, scoring once in the 2–2 draw against Goa. Later that month, he became the first player to manage a hat-trick during the campaign after achieving the feat in ten minutes away to Chennaiyin. 

Ogbeche continued competing in the Indian top division the following years, with Kerala Blasters (becoming their all-time top scorer), Mumbai City and Hyderabad. On 31 January 2022, following a brace against NorthEast United, he became the competition's all-time top scorer at 49 goals; Hyderabad eventually won the championship, and he was also crowned top scorer.

International career
A Nigerian international since the age of 17, Ogbeche was selected for the 2002 FIFA World Cup, and appeared in two matches in a group-stage exit. He scored two of his three goals for the national side on 29 May 2004, in a 3–0 friendly win against the Republic of Ireland held in Charlton, London.

Career statistics

Club

International

 Scores and results list Nigeria's goal tally first, score column indicates score after each Ogbeche goal.

Honours
Mumbai City
Indian Super League: 2020–21
Indian Super League Winners Shield: 2020–21

Hyderabad
Indian Super League: 2021–22

Individual
Indian Super League Golden Boot: 2021–22
Indian Super League Hero of the Month: January 2022

References

External links

Stats and bio at Cadistas1910 

1984 births
Living people
People from Cross River State
Nigerian footballers
Association football forwards
Ligue 1 players
Paris Saint-Germain F.C. players
SC Bastia players
FC Metz players
UAE Pro League players
Al Jazira Club players
La Liga players
Segunda División players
Deportivo Alavés players
Real Valladolid players
Cádiz CF players
Xerez CD footballers
Super League Greece players
Kavala F.C. players
English Football League players
Middlesbrough F.C. players
Eredivisie players
SC Cambuur players
Willem II (football club) players
Indian Super League players
NorthEast United FC players
Kerala Blasters FC players
Mumbai City FC players
Hyderabad FC players
Nigeria international footballers
2002 FIFA World Cup players
Nigerian expatriate footballers
Expatriate footballers in France
Expatriate footballers in the United Arab Emirates
Expatriate footballers in Spain
Expatriate footballers in Greece
Expatriate footballers in England
Expatriate footballers in the Netherlands
Expatriate footballers in India
Nigerian expatriate sportspeople in France
Nigerian expatriate sportspeople in the United Arab Emirates
Nigerian expatriate sportspeople in Spain
Nigerian expatriate sportspeople in Greece
Nigerian expatriate sportspeople in England
Nigerian expatriate sportspeople in the Netherlands
Nigerian expatriate sportspeople in India